Archduke Charles Stephen Eugene Viktor Felix Maria of Austria (5 September 1860 – 7 April 1933) was a member of the House of Habsburg, a Grand Admiral in the Austro-Hungarian Navy and candidate for the Polish crown.

Family
Charles Stephen was born at the castle of Gross Seelowitz in Moravia (today Židlochovice near Brno in the Czech Republic), the son of Archduke Karl Ferdinand of Austria 1818–1874, himself son of Archduke Charles, Duke of Teschen; and of his wife Archduchess Elisabeth Franziska of Austria (1831–1903). At his baptism he was given the names Karl Stephan Eugen Viktor Felix Maria. Among his siblings were Queen Maria Theresia of Bavaria, Archduke Friedrich of Austria, Queen Maria Cristina of Spain, and Archduke Eugen of Austria.

On 28 February 1886 at Vienna, Charles Stephen married Archduchess Maria Theresia, Princess of Tuscany (Brandeis-Altbunzlau (Brandýs nad Labem-Stará Boleslav), 18 September 1862–Castle of Saybusch (Żywiec), 10 May 1933). She was the daughter of Archduke Karl Salvator of Austria, Prince of Tuscany and his wife Princess Maria Immaculata of Bourbon-Two Sicilies. The ceremony took place in the Hofburg and was witnessed by Cardinal Ganglbauer.

Charles Stephen and Maria Theresia had six children:

Archduchess Eleonora of Austria (1886–1974) married morganatically Alfons von Kloss.
Archduchess Renata of Austria (1888–1935) married Prince Hieronymus Radziwill.
Archduke Karl Albrecht of Austria (1888–1951) married Alice Elisabeth Ankarcrona, had issue.
Archduchess Mechthildis of Austria (1891–1966) married Prince Olgierd Czartoryski.
Archduke Leo Karl of Austria (1893–1939) married Maria-Klothilde von Thuillières Gräfin von Montjoye-Vaufrey et de la Roche, had issue.
Archduke Wilhelm of Austria (1895–1948).

Military career

In 1879, Charles Stephen was commissioned as a Seefähnrich in the Austro-Hungarian Navy.  Appointed his naval governor in 1879 was Fregattenkapitän (later admiral) Hermann von Spaun, who accompanied him on a voyage to Brazil and North America in the goelette Saida. In 1896, he retired from active duty.  He continued, however, to be
advanced in rank, attaining the rank of admiral in 1901 and Grossadmiral (grand admiral) in 1911. He was named Marineinspekteur (navy inspector), making him the titular ranking officer of the navy. Others, however, had effective control of operations in 1914–1918; Anton Haus, Maximilian Njegovan and Miklós Horthy each served in turn as Flottenkommandant (Fleet Commander). In 1918, the Emperor Charles I put him in charge of the enquiry into the mutiny of the navy at Cattaro (now Kotor in Montenegro).  Charles Stephen recommended a sweeping re-organisation of the navy and the appointment of Miklós Horthy as commander-in-chief.

Charles Stephen was an officer à la suite of the Imperial German Navy and proprietary head of the 8th Austrian Infantry Regiment. His brother, Feldmarschall Archduke Friedrich, was commander-in-chief of the Austro-Hungarian Army from July 1914 to February 1917, and his eldest son, Archduke Karl Albrecht, held the rank of Oberst (colonel) at the end of World War I.

Candidate for Polish crown
On 5 November 1916, the German Emperor William II and the Emperor Franz Joseph I of Austria issued the 'Act of 5 November' creating the Kingdom of Poland as an independent State with a hereditary monarchy. Charles Stephen was considered as a candidate to be regent and eventually king.

At the time, Charles Stephen was living at the Castle of Saysbusch (Żywiec), in Galicia. His chances were enhanced by the fact that he spoke fluent Polish.  Two of his daughters were married to Polish princes belonging to the noble houses of Radziwill and Czartoryski. However, as Charles Stephen was a member of the Imperial House of Austria he needed permission to become king from the head of the family, Emperor Charles I, who hesitated, having himself planned to assume the Polish crown. Moreover, the Radziwill and Czartoryski families urged the cause of Russia (as their ancestors had in the 18th century). Adding to the political muddle was the support of Ukrainian nationalism by Charles Stephen's son, Archduke Wilhelm.

In the end, the proclamation was so vague and tentative that it failed to inspire enthusiasm among its supposed beneficiaries or even among the Germans and Austro-Hungarians themselves.

Yachting
In addition to his professional career as a naval officer, Charles Stephen took an active interest in yachting.  He was a flag officer of the Imperial and Royal Yacht Squadron.  His interest in yachting brought him to England on several occasions including in 1879 for the Royal Yacht Squadron Regatta, in 1900, and in 1911. In 1892, he was made a member of the (British) Yacht Racing Association.  He purchased several British yachts including the Valkyrie from the Earl of Dunraven in 1892  and the Ul from Ramage and Ferguson Limited in 1911. His yacht Waturus was sold to Randal Morgan, an American, in June 1902, and eventually it had a long marine career in both military and civilian service as HMCS Hochelaga.

Estates
When Charles Stephen's uncle Archduke Albert, Duke of Teschen died in 1895, he and his brothers each inherited large estates.  His largest properties were in Galicia especially at Saybusch (now Żywiec in Poland).  Among the businesses operated here was the Żywiec Brewery which was nationalized by the Communists after World War II.  Charles Stephen had a palace at Pola (now Pula in Croatia) and a winter palace in Lussin (now Lošinj).  He also had a palace in Vienna in the Wiedner Hauptstrasse.

Honours
Charles Stephen received the following decorations and awards:

In 1916 he was named Protector of the Polish Academy of Learning in Krakow. He was a Großadmiral (Grand Admiral) in the Austro-Hungarian Navy, equivalent to the rank of Feldmarschall (Field Marshal) in the army.

Later life
After 1918 Charles Stephen acquired Polish citizenship and continued to live in Żywiec, which had passed to the sovereignty of the Republic of Poland. He died there on 7 April 1933. Archduchess Maria Theresa died there a month later, on 10 May 1933.

Ancestry

Notes

Further reading
 Ryan, Nellie. My Years at the Austrian Court. London: J. Lane, 1915. The memoirs of an English governess in Charles Stephen's household.

External links
 Admiral Erzherzog Karl Stefan von Österreich-Teschen at www.geocities.com

1860 births
1933 deaths
People from Židlochovice
People from the Margraviate of Moravia
House of Habsburg-Lorraine
Austro-Hungarian admirals
Austrian princes
Knights of the Golden Fleece of Austria
Grand Crosses of the Order of Saint Stephen of Hungary
3
3
3
Recipients of the Gold Imtiyaz Medal
Recipients of the Silver Imtiyaz Medal
Bailiffs Grand Cross of Honour and Devotion of the Sovereign Military Order of Malta